Kristín Marja Baldursdóttir (born 21 January 1949 in Hafnarfjörður), is an Icelandic writer.

Background 
She received her degree in 1991 from the University of Iceland in the fields of German and Icelandic.

Writing 
Her first novel Mávahlátur (Seagull's Laughter) became a play and film. Her work has been translated into German, Dutch, Danish, Norwegian and Swedish. Within Iceland, her 'work has [...] been important in breaking down the borders between elite and popular culture', her novels tending to focus on 'women's issues in contemporary urban society'.

Honors 
On 16 November 2011, Kristín Marja received the Jónas Hallgrímsson Award, given every year to an important Icelandic writer. According to the jury's verdict, "Kristín Marja's subject matter is the reality of Icelandic women. She illuminates the life and work, dreams and longings of women."

Novels
 Mávahlátur (The Seagull's Laughter) 1995
 Hús úr húsi (From House to House) 1997
 Kular af degi (As the Day gets colder) 1999
 Mynd af konu ( Portrait of a woman) 2000
 Kvöldljósin eru kveikt (The Nightlights are on) 2001
 Karitas án titils (Karitas untitled) 2004
 Óreiða á striga (Chaos on Canvas) 2007
 Karlsvagninn (The Big Dipper) 2009
 Kantata (Cantata) 2012
 Svartalogn (Black Calm) 2016
 Gata mæðranna (Street of the Mothers) 2020

External links
A page about Kristín Marja on the Icelandic website Bokmenntir.is
Website about Margrét Vilhjálmsdóttir, who played the character Freyja in the film version of "Mávahlátur"

References

Kristin Marja Baldursdottir
1949 births
Living people
Kristin Marja Baldursdottir
Kristin Marja Baldursdottir